Vemuri (వేమూరి) is an Indian given name. Notable people with the name include:

 Vemuri Anjaneya Sarma (1917–2003), Indian writer
 Vemuri Gaggaiah (1895–1955), Indian actor
 Vemuri Radhakrishna, Indian media executive

Indian given names